The 2018–19 Brown Bears men's basketball team represented Brown University during the 2018–19 NCAA Division I men's basketball season. The Bears, led by seventh-year head coach Mike Martin, played their home games at the Pizzitola Sports Center in Providence, Rhode Island as members of the Ivy League. They finished the season 20-12, 7-7 in Ivy League Play to finish a 3-way tie for 4th place. They failed to qualify for the Ivy League tournament. They received an at-large bid to the College Basketball Invitational where they defeated UAB in the first round before losing in the quarterfinals to Loyola Marymount.

Previous season 
The Bears finished the 2017–18 season 11–16, 4–10 in Ivy League play to finish in second-to-last place. They failed to qualify for the Ivy League tournament.

Roster

Schedule and results

|-
!colspan=9 style=| Non-conference regular season

|-
!colspan=9 style=| Ivy League regular season

|-
!colspan=9 style=| College Basketball Invitational

Source

References

Brown Bears men's basketball seasons
Brown
Brown
Brown
Brown Bears